Sangram Anantrao Thopate is an Indian politician serving as Member of the Maharashtra Legislative Assembly from Bhor (Vidhan Sabha constituency) as a member of Indian National Congress.

On 22 March 2017, Thopate was suspended along with 18 other MLAs until 31 December for interrupting Maharashtra Finance Minister Sudhir Mungantiwar during a state budget session and burning copies of the budget outside the assembly four days earlier.

References

Maharashtra MLAs 2014–2019
Living people
Indian National Congress politicians
People from Pune district
Marathi politicians
Year of birth missing (living people)
Indian National Congress politicians from Maharashtra